Rakhsh Khodro co or RKD is an Iranian truck manufacturer established in 2005 and located in Tabriz. This company is a strategic partner of Kamaz of Russia, JAC and Jinbei of China, and Maz-Man of Belarus. It produces Kamaz trucks, JAC light trucks and its own designed minibus. Its headquarters is in Tabriz, Iran.

Truck manufacturers of Iran
Vehicle manufacturing companies established in 2005
Economy of Iranian Azerbaijan